Tricholoma magnivelare is a gilled mushroom found East of the Rocky Mountains in North America growing in coniferous woodland. These ectomycorrhizal fungi are typically edible species that exist in a symbiotic relationship with various species of pine, commonly jack pine. They belong to the genus Tricholoma, which includes the closely related East Asian songi or matsutake as well as the Western matsutake (T. murrillianum) and Meso-American matsutake (Tricholoma mesoamericanum).  T. magnivelare is also known as the ponderosa mushroom, pine mushroom, American matsutake.

Species designation
Until recently, Tricholoma magnivelare was the name used to describe all matsutake mushrooms found growing in North America. Since the early 2000s, molecular data has indicated the presence of separate species previously grouped within T. magnivelare. Only those found in the Eastern United States and Canada have retained the T. magnivelare name.

Description
The spores are white.

The mycelium is thought to be parasitized by the plant Allotropa virgata, which primarily feeds on matsutake.

Edibility
While tough, the mushroom can be eaten both raw and cooked and is considered choice. In recent years, globalization and wider social acceptability of mushroom hunting has made collection of pine mushrooms widely popular in North America.

Local mushroom hunters sell their harvest daily to local depots, which rush them to airports. The mushrooms are then shipped fresh by air to Asia where demand is high and prices are at a premium.

Serious poisonings have resulted from confusion of this mushroom with poisonous white Amanita species.

Similar species
Similar species in the genus include Tricholoma apium, T. caligatum, T. focale, and T. vernaticum. Other similar species include Catathelasma imperiale, C. ventricosum, Russula brevipes, and the poisonous Amanita smithiana.

See also
List of North American Tricholoma
List of Tricholoma species

References

External links

 Mushroom-Collecting.com - Matsutake
Mykoweb profile of T. magnivelare

magnivelare
Edible fungi
Fungi described in 1873
Fungi of North America
Taxa named by Charles Horton Peck